Surajit Sengupta (30 August 1951 – 17 February 2022) was an Indian footballer who played as a winger. He played for the India national team, representing the country in the 1974 Asian Games in Tehran and the 1978 Asian Games in Bangkok. In a domestic career spanning twelve years between 1971 and 1983,  he had represented all three of Calcutta's football clubs, Mohun Bagan FC, East Bengal FC, and Mohammedan Sporting FC, and was considered one of the finest forwards of his time. Sengupta won the IFA Shield and the Calcutta Football League six times each and the Durand Cup thrice while representing East Bengal FC. 

He appeared with East Bengal from 1974 to 1980 and captained the team in 1978–79. He received the lifetime achievement award from East Bengal in 2018.

Early life 
Sengupta was born on 30 August 1951, in Chakbazar in the Hooghly district of West Bengal. His father, Suhas Sengupta, was a football and cricket player who worked for Dunlop India. Sengupta studied at the Hooghly Branch School where he was spotted by coach Ashwini Bharat. He went on to study at the Hooghly Mohsin College and made his second division debut for Robert Hudson FC.

Club career 
Sengupta made his domestic debut playing for the Kidderpore club in 1971 before moving to Mohun Bagan AC and playing for the club between 1972 and 1974. He was part of Mohun Bagan's Bangladesh tour in May 1972, where they defeated Dhaka Mohammedan and lost to Dhaka XI. He later moved to East Bengal FC for six seasons between 1974 and 1980. He represented Mohammedan SC between 1980 and 1981 before returning to Mohan Bagan between 1981 and 1983. 

Amongst his best experiences was a 1975 IFA Shield Final where he led East Bengal's 5–0 win against their Kolkata rivals Mohun Bagan. Most of his victories came during his time with East Bengal FC. He was also the captain of the West Bengal team in the 1976 Santosh Trophy. In a domestic career spanning twelve years he represented all three of Calcutta's football clubs and had won the IFA Shield and the Calcutta Football League six times each and the Durand Cup thrice for East Bengal FC.

Sengupta received the lifetime achievement award from East Bengal in 2018.

International career 
Sengupta made his debut for the India national team in 1974 in a game against Thailand in the Merdeka Cup in Kuala Lumpur. He represented the country in 14 games, including the 1974 Asian Games in Tehran and the 1978 Asian Games in Bangkok. He also represented the country in the 1974 Merdeka Cup and the 1977 President's Cup in Seoul.

Style of play 
Sengupta played as winger and was known for his playing speed and passing range. Per an article in the Indian newspaper The Hindu, he was considered one of the finest and creative forwards of his time.

Personal life and death 
Sengupta was married to Shyamali Sengupta, with whom he had a son. After his retirement he was involved with the game as a sports editor with a Bengali language magazine writing their football columns. He learnt singing and would play the Tabla with his son. East Bengal coach and former Indian footballer P. K. Banerjee had named him Sócrates after the Brazilian footballer, given his sporting a beard and his varied interests.

Sengupta died from COVID-19-related complications on 17 February 2022, at the age of 70.

Honours
East Bengal
Calcutta Football League: 1974, 1975, 1977
DCM Trophy: 1974
IFA Shield: 1974, 1975, 1976
Darjeeling Gold Cup: 1976
Federation Cup: 1978–79
Rovers Cup: 1973–74, 1975–76
Durand Cup: 1978
Bordoloi Trophy: 1978

See also
 List of SC East Bengal captains

References

Bibliography

 
 

Bandyopadhyay, Santipriya (1979). Cluber Naam East Bengal . Kolkata: New Bengal Press.
Chattopadhyay, Hariprasad (2017). Mohun Bagan–East Bengal . Kolkata: Parul Prakashan.

Further reading

External links
News on Surajit Sengupta at The Telegraph

1951 births
2022 deaths
Deaths from the COVID-19 pandemic in India
Indian footballers
India international footballers
Footballers from West Bengal
Association football wingers
Footballers at the 1974 Asian Games
Footballers at the 1978 Asian Games
Asian Games competitors for India
Mohun Bagan AC players
East Bengal Club players
Mohammedan SC (Kolkata) players
People from Hooghly district